I Got You is a Philippine romantic comedy series broadcast on TV5. Directed by Dan Villegas, it stars Beauty Gonzalez, RK Bagatsing, and Jane Oineza. It premiered on October 18, 2020, on the network's Sunday afternoon block and aired every Sunday until January 10, 2021. In June 2021, the show became available on Brightlight Productions programming affiliate ABS-CBN's streaming platform iWantTFC and worldwide via The Filipino Channel.

On January 17, 2021, the same day Sunday Noontime Live! and Sunday 'Kada aired their final episodes, I Got You aired a replay of its final episode. In June 2021, the show became available on Brightlight Productions programming affiliate ABS-CBN's streaming platform iWantTFC and worldwide via The Filipino Channel.

Premise
Del Ruiz (Beauty Gonzalez) is a successful therapist who has a vast experience in the field of psychology, having worked both at home and abroad. However, her own life is full of obstacles and heartaches that she must try to navigate, including motherhood. An old flame in the form of Louie (RK Bagatsing), a former soldier with PTSD resurfaces after a long time away, who just happens to be the secret lover in the life of social media influencer Rissa, Del's new client. Temptation and sorrow of the past come to battle with Del's heart and soul, as she tries to comprehend her true feelings and character.

Cast
Main cast
 Beauty Gonzalez as Del - a therapist and Louie's ex
 RK Bagatsing as Louie - Risa's boyfriend-turned-fiancé and Del's ex
 Jane Oineza as Risa - a beauty vlogger and Louie's fiancée
Supporting cast
 Chantal Videla as Iya - Del and Louie's daughter
 Dionne Monsanto as Hailey - owner of the bar Louie applies to for work

See also
 List of programs broadcast by TV5 (Philippine TV network)
 List of programs broadcast by Kapamilya Channel
 List of programs broadcast by A2Z (Philippine TV channel)
 List of programs broadcast by Kapamilya Online Live
 List of programs broadcast by Jeepney TV
 The Filipino Channel
 Kapatid Channel

References

External links

TV5 (Philippine TV network) drama series
2020 Philippine television series debuts
2021 Philippine television series endings
Filipino-language television shows
Television series by Brightlight Productions
Philippine drama television series
Television series by Cignal Entertainment